Leptaulax bicolor is a beetle of the Family Passalidae found throughout Australia, Cambodia, Eastern Himalayas, India, Indonesia: Borneo, Java, Moluccas, Sulawesi, Sumatra; Laos, Malaysia, Myanmar, New Guinea, Philippines, Sri Lanka, Thailand and Vietnam.

Description
Parietal ridge extending to supraorbital ridge. The anterior marginal groove of pronotum is more pronounced and broader. Body consists with many large, distinct punctures. Hypostomal process without longitudinal groove on ventrum.

Synonyms
There are several synonyms assigned to the species due to widespread distribution and similarity with other related species.

 Leptaulacides analis Zang, 1906
 Leptaulacides anaulax Zang, 1905
 Leptaulacides andamanarum Zang, 1905
 Leptaulacides fruhstorferi Zang, 1905
 Leptaulacides nietneri Zang, 1905
 Leptaulacides palawanicus Zang, 1905
 Leptaulacides papuanus Zang, 1906
 Leptaulacides rugulosus Zang, 1905
 Leptaulax abdominisculptus Kuwert, 1891
 Leptaulax aurivillii Kuwert, 1891
 Leptaulax batchianae Kuwert, 1891
 Leptaulax calcuttae Kuwert, 1891
 Leptaulax cicatricosus Kuwert, 1891
 Leptaulax consequens Kuwert, 1891
 Leptaulax differentispina Kuwert, 1891
 Leptaulax dindigalensis Kuwert, 1898
 Leptaulax divaricatus Kuwert, 1898
 Leptaulax evidens Kuwert, 1898
 Leptaulax formosanus Doesburg, 1942
 Leptaulax geminus Kuwert, 1898
 Leptaulax hansemanni Kuwert, 1898
 Leptaulax incipiens Kuwert, 1891
 Leptaulax malaccae Kuwert, 1891
 Leptaulax manillae Kuwert, 1891
 Leptaulax maxillonotus Kuwert, 1891
 Leptaulax medius Kuwert, 1891
 Leptaulax morator Kuwert, 1898
 Leptaulax niae Kuwert, 1898
 Leptaulax novaeguineae Kuwert, 1891
 Leptaulax obtusidens Kuwert, 1891
 Leptaulax roepstorfi Kuwert, 1898
 Leptaulax separandus Kuwert, 1891
 Leptaulax sequens Kuwert, 1898
 Leptaulax subconsequens Kuwert, 1891
 Leptaulax sumatrae Kuwert, 1898
 Leptaulax tenesserimensis Kuwert, 1898
 Passalus innocuus Dejean, 1837
 Passalus vicinus Percheron, 1844
 Passalus bicolor Fabricius, 1801

References 

Passalidae